Those Were the Days is an American weekly comic strip drawn by Art Beeman which was syndicated by the Al Smith Feature Service from 1951 to 1983. 

The strip compared life in earlier times, apparently the late 19th century or very early 20th century, with "modern life", at the time of the strip's popularity, the 1950s and 1960s. The title of the strip was printed in an antique typeface. Between the "olden days" panel and the "modern" panel were the words, "But Now - Wow!", emphasizing the contrast between mores of different generations.

References

External links
 Those Were the Days at Piccolo Museo delle Strip Originale

American comic strips
1951 comics debuts
1983 comics endings
Gag-a-day comics
Historical comics